Bahadurabad is one of the neighbourhoods of Gulshan Town, Karachi, Sindh, Pakistan. It is located in the Civic Centre zone in the Gulshan Town. It was originally inhabited by mainly middle class Hyderabadi Muslim refugees from Hyderabad Deccan (now Hyderabad, Telangana, India) who migrated after the creation of Pakistan in 1947 and mainly after Hyderabad became part of India in 1948.

Bahadurabad neighbourhood in Karachi is named after the noted freedom fighter Bahadur Yar Jang (1905–1944), a Muslim nationalist from Hyderabad Deccan. In 2007, a replica of the famous Charminar monument of Hyderabad in India, was constructed on the main crossing of Bahadurabad.

Gallery

See also
 Gulshan Town
 Bahadur Yar Jung
 Hyderabad Colony
 Abdul Rashid Godil

References

External links
Karachi Metropolitan Corporation official website

Neighbourhoods of Karachi
Gulshan Town